Oppen is a surname. Notable people with the surname include:

 George Oppen (1908–1984), was an American poet.
 Mary Oppen (1908–1990), American activist, artist, photographer, poet and writer. 
 Carl Lauritz Mechelborg Oppen (1830–1914), Norwegian jurist and politician. 
 Edward A. Oppen, creator of one of the first stamp catalogues in English.